Mohinder Saran is a politician in Manitoba, Canada.  He represented the electoral division of The Maples in the Legislative Assembly of Manitoba from 2007 until 2019. He was first elected in the 2007 provincial election. Saran was re-elected as a member of the New Democratic Party in two subsequent elections and served as Minister of Housing and Community Development from 2015 to 2016 in the final government of Greg Selinger.

He was suspended from the NDP caucus on 31 January 2017 due to sexual harassment allegations. He did not run in the 2019 provincial election.

Personal life
Saran was born in the Punjab region of India before moving to Canada in 1970.

References

Independent MLAs in Manitoba
New Democratic Party of Manitoba MLAs
Living people
Politicians from Winnipeg
21st-century Canadian politicians
Canadian politicians of Indian descent
Year of birth missing (living people)